Ramnarayan Mandal is the member of the Bihar Legislative Assembly from Banka constituency. He is a leader of Bhartiya Janta Party.

He is currently a Minister of Revenue & Land Reforms in Bihar's Nitish Government Cabinet.

He was elected MLA for the first time in 1990. He won the Banka assembly seat for the 5th time in 2015.

References

Living people
People from Banka district
Bharatiya Janata Party politicians from Bihar
Bihar MLAs 2020–2025
1953 births
Lok Janshakti Party politicians